The first season of Bates Motel aired from March 18-May 20, 2013. The season consisted of 10 episodes and aired on Mondays at 10 p.m. ET/PT on A&E. The series is described as a "contemporary prequel" to the 1960 film Psycho and follows the life of Norman Bates and his mother Norma prior to the events portrayed in the Hitchcock film. The series takes place in the fictional town of White Pine Bay, Oregon.

The season received positive reviews from television critics. In its premiere episode, the series broke rating records for an original drama series on A&E, drawing in a total of 3.04 million viewers. Bates Motel was renewed for a second season after three episodes of the first season had aired. Vera Farmiga received particular praise for her performance as Norma Louise Bates, she won the 2013 Saturn Award for Best Actress on Television, and was nominated for the 2013 Primetime Emmy Award for Outstanding Lead Actress in a Drama Series, the 2013 Critics' Choice Television Award for Best Actress in a Drama Series, and the 2013 TCA Award for Individual Achievement in Drama. The first season was released on Blu-ray and DVD on September 17, 2013.

Cast and characters

Main

 Vera Farmiga as Norma Louise Bates
 Freddie Highmore as Norman Bates
 Max Thieriot as Dylan Massett
 Olivia Cooke as Emma Decody
 Nicola Peltz as Bradley Martin

Recurring
 Nestor Carbonell as Sheriff Alex Romero
 Mike Vogel as Deputy Zack Shelby
 Keegan Connor Tracy as Miss Blair Watson
 Brittney Wilson as Lissa
 Jere Burns as Jake Abernathy
 Diana Bang as Jiao
 Vincent Gale as Gil Turner
 Richard Harmon as Richard Sylmore
 Ian Tracey as Remo Wallace
 Terry Chen as Ethan Chang
 Ian Hart as Will Decody
 Hiro Kanagawa as Dr. Fumhiro Kurata
 David Cubitt as Sam Bates
 Keenan Tracey as Gunner
 Aliyah O'Brien as Regina

Guest
 W. Earl Brown as Keith Summers
 Lara Gilchrist as Rebecca Craig
 Ben Cotton as Danny

Production

Casting
A&E gave Bates Motel a straight-to-series order in July 2012. Vera Farmiga was the first to be cast, as protagonist Norma Louise Bates in August. Shortly after, Freddie Highmore was cast as Norman Bates in September. The same month, Max Thieriot was cast as Norman's half brother, Dylan Massett. Nicola Peltz was cast as Bradley Martin. Olivia Cooke was the final main cast member to join the series, portraying Emma Decody.

Filming
A replica of the original Bates Motel set from the film Psycho was built on location in Aldergrove, British Columbia on 272nd Street, where the series is filmed. Production also took place in Greater Vancouver, and Richmond, British Columbia. Principal photography for the first season began on October 1, 2012. Though filming for the first season was expected to wrap on January 24, 2013, production continued into early February.

Episodes

Reception

Critical response
The first season of Bates Motel received mostly positive reviews. It received 66 out of 100 from Metacritic, based on 34 critical responses, indicating "generally favorable reviews". Rotten Tomatoes aggregated that 81% of 37 television critics gave the series a positive review. The site's consensus reads, "Bates Motel utilizes mind manipulation and suspenseful fear tactics, on top of consistently sharp character work and wonderfully uncomfortable familial relationships". A&E renewed the series for a second season following the positive reviews and good ratings after the first three episodes.

Ratings
On its premiere night, the series broke rating records for an original drama series on A&E. It drew in a strong 3.04 million viewers total, including 1.6 million viewers watching it in the 18-49 demographic. The season finale episode drew in a total of 2.70 million viewers, with a 1.2 ratings share in the 18–49 demo. Overall, the first season averaged 2.70 million viewers, with 1.5 million tuning in from both the 18–49 and 25–54 demographics.

Awards and nominations

In its first season, Bates Motel was nominated for 24 awards, winning one.

References

External links
 
 

2013 American television seasons
Season 1
Murder in television
Patricide in fiction
Rape in television